Rocky Face is an unincorporated community in the U.S. state of Georgia, located in Whitfield County. Its zipcode is: 30740.

History
A post office was established at Rocky Face in 1890. The community was named for a nearby rock formation which resembled a human face.

See also
Battle of Rocky Face Ridge

References

Unincorporated communities in Whitfield County, Georgia
Unincorporated communities in Georgia (U.S. state)